The 85th Infantry Division also known as "Custer Division" (named after the cavalry commander George Armstrong Custer) was an infantry division of the United States Army in World War I and World War II. It currently exists as the 85th Support Command.

World War I

The division was first activated 25 August 1917 at Camp Custer, Michigan, and comprised the 169th and 170th Infantry brigades and the 160th Field Artillery Brigade. After a year of training the division left the United States for England.

The Division was composed of the following units:

 Headquarters, 85th Division
 169th Infantry Brigade
 337th Infantry Regiment
 338th Infantry Regiment
 329th Machine Gun Battalion
 170th Infantry Brigade
 339th Infantry Regiment
 340th Infantry Regiment
 330th Machine Gun Battalion
 160th Field Artillery Brigade
 328th Field Artillery Regiment (75 mm)
 329th Field Artillery Regiment (75 mm)
 330th Field Artillery Regiment (155 mm)
 310th Trench Mortar Battery
 328th Machine Gun Battalion
 310th Engineer Regiment
 310th Field Signal Battalion
 Headquarters Troop, 85th Division
 310th Train Headquarters and Military Police
 310th Ammunition Train
 310th Supply Train
 310th Engineer Train
 310th Sanitary Train 
 337th, 338th, 339th, and 340th Ambulance Companies and Field Hospitals

From England the 339th Infantry Regiment sailed to Archangel, Russia to fight along the White Army in the Russian Civil War against Bolshevik forces as part of the Polar Bear Expedition.  Accompanying the 339th were the 1st Battalion, 310th Engineers, the 337th Ambulance Company, and the 337th Field Hospital.
After arrival in France as part of the American Expeditionary Forces, the remainder of the division was broken up to support other units.  The Headquarters was stationed in Lorraine as a depot division and therefore did not participate in any combat operations.  Doughboys of the Division served in other Divisions at the Battles for St. Mihiel, Marbache and in the Meuse-Argonne on the Western Front.
After the war the division remained on occupation duty in Germany and by August 1919, the last elements of the division returned to the United States.

Interwar period

The division was reconstituted in the Organized Reserve on 24 June 1921 and assigned to the state of Michigan. The headquarters was organized on 10 September 1921.

World War II

On 15 May 1942, five months after the United States entered World War II, the 85th Infantry Division was ordered into active military service at Camp Shelby, Mississippi, under the command of Major General Wade H. Haislip. Divisions in the U.S. Army at that time were "triangularized" with three combat regiments instead of the four regiment structure "square division" used during World War I. The 340th Infantry Regiment was redesignated as the 410th Quartermaster Battalion and left the division. Basic infantry training was begun in June 1942 at Camp Shelby, Mississippi. In April 1943, it participated in large-scale army training in the Louisiana Maneuvers near Leesville, Louisiana. In August, the division was moved to Camp Coxcomb, California for desert warfare training. In October, the division was transferred to Fort Dix, New Jersey, for final preparations before shipment overseas. Major General John B. Coulter was transferred as commander and retained this position throughout the war. The Assistant Division Commander (ADC) throughout the war was Brigadier General Lee S. Gerow.

 Headquarters, 85th Infantry Division
 337th Infantry Regiment
 338th Infantry Regiment
 339th Infantry Regiment
 Headquarters and Headquarters Battery, 85th Infantry Division Artillery
 328th Field Artillery Battalion (105 mm)
 329th Field Artillery Battalion (105 mm)
 403rd Field Artillery Battalion (155 mm)
 910th Field Artillery Battalion (105 mm)
 310th Engineer Combat Battalion
 310th Medical Battalion
 85th Cavalry Reconnaissance Troop (Mechanized)
 Headquarters, Special Troops, 85th Infantry Division
 Headquarters Company, 85th Infantry Division
 785th Ordnance Light Maintenance Company
 85th Quartermaster Company
 85th Signal Company
 Military Police Platoon
 Band
 85th Counterintelligence Corps Detachment

The 85th Infantry Division left the United States on 24 December 1943 and arrived in Casablanca, French Morocco on 2 January 1944. It received amphibious training at Port aux Poules near Arzew and Oran, Algeria, 1 February to 23 March, then embarked for Naples, Italy, arriving on 27 March. The 339th Regimental Combat Team was the first division element to depart Port-Aux-Poules for movement to the Italian Campaign. Arriving in Italy on 14 March, the 339th RCT was attached to the 88th Infantry Division and became the first regiment of the 85th to see combat during World War II on the Minturno-Castelforte front north of Naples, 28 March. The 85th Division, under II Corps of the U.S. Fifth Army under Mark W. Clark, was committed to action as a unit, 10 April 1944, north of the Garigliano River, facing the Gustav Line, and held defensive positions for a month.

On 11 May, it launched its attack, taking Solacciano, Castellonorato, and Formia. Itri fell, 19 May, and the 85th continued to mop up the Gaeta Peninsula. Terracina was taken and the road to the Anzio beachhead was opened. The division pursued the enemy to the hills near Sezze until pinched out by friendly forces from Anzio. The Gustav Line had been smashed and the 85th started for a rest area on 29 May, but was ordered to the Lariano sector which the division cleared by the 31st. Driving on Rome, the 85th pushed through Monte Compatri and Frascati, entered the Italian capital of Rome on 5 June 1944, and advanced to Viterbo before being relieved on 10 June.

After rehabilitation and training, the 85th took over the defense of the Arno River line from 15 to 26 August. The division attacked the mountain defenses of the Gothic Line on 13 September, and broke through, taking Firenzuola on the 21st. The 85th advanced slowly through mud and rain against heavy resistance taking La Martina and gaining the Idice River Valley road on 2 October, and reaching Mount Mezzano on the 24th overlooking the Po River Valley. From 27 October to 22 November 1944, defense areas near Pizzano were held. On the 23d, the division was relieved for rest and rehabilitation.

The 85th Division relieved the British 1st Infantry Division on 6 January 1945, and limited its activities to cautious patrols until 13 March. After a brief training period, the 85th, now under the command of Major General Willis D. Crittenberger's IV Corps, during the final offensive in Italy, thrust southwest of Bologna on 14 April, pushing through Lucca and Pistoia into the Po Valley as enemy resistance collapsed. The Panaro River was crossed on the 23rd and the Po the next day. The division mopped up fleeing Germans until their mass surrender on 2 May 1945, in the Belluno-Agordo area. The end of World War II in Europe came six days later. Three soldiers from the 85th Infantry Division earned the Medal of Honor.

Casualties
Total battle casualties: 8,774
Killed in action: 1,561
Wounded in action: 6,314
Missing in action: 402
Prisoner of war: 497

Cold War
The division returned to the United States and was disbanded at Camp Patrick Henry, Virginia on 26 August 1945. It was then reconstituted and reactivated at Chicago, Illinois on 19 February 1947 in the U.S. Army Reserve. On 1 June 1959, the division's mission was changed to training and it was named the 85th Division (Training).

Organization
Upon reactivation in the Army Reserve, the division was organized with a division headquarters, three training brigades and a training group, with division headquarters located in Chicago, Illinois. In 1983, the Division Headquarters was moved to Arlington Heights, Illinois, with subordinate brigade headquarters located in Waukegan, Illinois (1st Brigade); St. Louis, Missouri (2nd Brigade); Rockford, Illinois (3rd Brigade); Fort Sheridan, Illinois (4th Brigade); and Aurora, Illinois (Training Group). 

In 1992, the division was reorganized into the 85th Division (Exercise) with the mission of conducting lanes training for combat, combat support, and combat service support units and combat simulation, computer supported exercises for company/battalion and higher units for Army Reserve and Army National Guard units in the First Army area. Additionally, the division was tasked to assist First Army units at mobilization to validate their readiness for deployment. The division was reorganized as follows:

 85th Division (Exercise) HQ, Arlington Heights, Illinois
 85th Division (Exercise) Band, Fort Sheridan, Illinois
 1st Brigade (Battle Command Staff Training), Fort Sheridan, Illinois
 2nd Brigade (Field Exercise), Fort McCoy, Wisconsin
 3rd Brigade (Field Exercise), Selfridge ANGB, Michigan
 4th Brigade (Field Exercise), Fort Sheridan, Illinois
 5th Brigade (Field Exercise), Fort Snelling, Minnesota
 6th Brigade (Field Exercise), Fort Benjamin Harrison, Indiana

In 1999 the division was further reorganized as the 85th Division (Training Support).  Its four brigades were headquartered as follows:
 1st Brigade (Training Support (TS)): 1st Simulations Exercise (SIMEX) Group; 2nd SIMEX Group; and 3rd Battalion (TS), 335th Regiment at Fort Sheridan, Illinois
 2nd Brigade (TS): 3rd Battalion (TS), 335th Regiment, 1st Battalion (TS), 338th Regiment; 1st Battalion (TS), 340th Regiment, 3rd Battalion (TS), 340th Regiment, 2nd Battalion, 411th Regiment (Logistics Support) at Fort McCoy, Wisconsin
 3rd Brigade (TS): 1st Battalion (TS) and 2nd Battalion (TS), 335th Regiment; 2nd Battalion (TS), 338th Regiment; 3rd Battalion, 411th Regiment (Logistics Support) at Indianapolis, IN
 4th Brigade (TS): 1st Battalion (TS) and 3rd Battalion (TS), 337th Regiment; 1st Battalion (TS), 409th Regiment; 1st Battalion (TS), 2nd Battalion (TS), and 3rd Battalion (TS) 410th Regiment; 1st Battalion, 411th Regiment (Logistics Support) at Fort Knox, KY.

Distinguished Leaders
Commanders within the division who became U.S. Army general officers include:
 MG Emile Bataille who commanded the 2nd Simulation Group, 1st Brigade, and then as an Army National Guard Brigadier General was the Assistant Adjutant General of Illinois and then served as the J6, United States Strategic Command
 MG Steve Best, who commanded the 1st Simulation Group, 1st Brigade and then commanded the 1st Brigade, and later commanded the 75th Division in Houston, TX
 MG William D. Razz Waff, who commanded the 2nd Simulation Group, 1st Brigade, and then served as the Chief of Staff, 88th Regional Readiness Command, Ft Snelling, MN, the Deputy Commanding General, 99th Regional Readiness Command, Pittsburgh, PA, was the Deputy Commanding General, US Army Human Resources Command, Alexandria, VA, the Commanding General, 99th Regional Support Command, Ft Dix, NJ and then as the Deputy G-1, Headquarters, US Army, The Pengagon
 BG Ward Arnston, commander, 1st Simulation Group, then as the CG, 1st Brigade, 85th Division, then as the Deputy Commanding General, 75th Division, Houston, TX;
 BG John Hanley, commander, 1st Simulation Group, 1st Brigade, then as the Deputy Commanding General, 88th Regional Support Command, Ft McCoy, WI;
 BG Ronald S. Mangum, who commanded the 1st and 4th Brigades, the Battle Projection Group, and the 1st Battalion, 340th Infantry (INST).

Unit inactivation and reactivation
In September 2007, the 85th Division (Training Support) was formally inactivated and its remaining assets folded into the 75th Division (Training Support) and the 88th Regional Readiness Command. In December 2008, the 85th Division was reactivated as the 85th Support Command to provide training and logistical support to First Army.

Heraldry
Nickname: Custer Division
Shoulder Sleeve Insignia: The shoulder sleeve insignia was originally approved for the 85th Division on 24 December 1918. It was cancelled and a new design approved for the 85th Division (Training) on 29 June 1970 (Pentagon inside octagon). On 24 February 1986, the original shoulder sleeve insignia, (large red "CD" initials) was reinstated for the 85th Division (Training). The insignia was redesignated for the 85th Division (Training Support) effective 17 October 1999. It was redesignated for the 85th U.S. Army Reserve Support Command on 4 November 2008. (TIOH Drawing Number A-1-540)

 Distinctive Unit Insignia: General George Custer is represented by the colors scarlet and blue used on his personal flag, and by the scarlet cravat bearing the device of the Michigan Cavalry Brigade, which often formed a part of his uniform. His distinguished service in the Cavalry is recalled by the crossed sabres, and laurel wreath refers to his many victories and achievements in the service of his country. The blue scroll with two stars on either refer to the rank of major general which Custer attained during the Civil War, becoming the Army's youngest general.

Campaign streamers

Decorations

Bibliography 
Army Publication:  "Minturno to the Apennines", booklet published by MTOUSA and issued to troops in 1945.
House, John M. Wolfhounds and Polar Bears: The American Expeditionary Force in Siberia, 1918-1920. Tuscaloosa: University of Alabama Press, 2016.  
Nelson, James Carl. The Polar Bear Expedition: The Heroes of America's Forgotten Invasion of Russia, 1918-1919. First ed. New York, NY: William Morrow, an imprint of HarperCollins, 2019.  
Unit History: Schultz, Paul; History of the 85th Infantry Division in World War II. Battery Press, 1979.

References

External links

Minturno To the Appennines - 85th Division
 US Army Reserve 85th Support Command official website

Infantry divisions of the United States Army
Military units and formations established in 1917
United States Army divisions of World War I
Infantry Division, U.S. 085
85
Infantry divisions of the United States Army in World War II